William H. Zeliff Jr. (June 12, 1936 – October 18, 2021) was an American Republican politician from New Hampshire who was a member of the U.S. House of Representatives from 1991 to 1997.

Early life
Zeliff was born in East Orange, New Jersey in June 1936, Zeliff graduated from Milford High School in Milford, Connecticut in 1954 and received his B.S. at the University of Connecticut in 1959, where he was a member of the Delta Chi fraternity. He served in the Connecticut Army National Guard from 1958–64 and afterwards was in the United States Army Reserve..

Career
Zeliff worked as a sales and marketing manager in the consumer products division of E. I. du Pont de Nemours and Company from 1959 to 1976 and was also an innkeeper and small business owner. He ran unsuccessfully for the New Hampshire Senate in 1984 and was a delegate to the 1988 Republican National Convention which nominated George H. W. Bush for the presidency.

He was elected to the United States House of Representatives in 1990, took seat in 1991 and was reelected in 1992 and 1994. In 1996, Zeliff opted to instead run in the gubernatorial race for Governor of New Hampshire. He lost the nomination to the chairman of the New Hampshire Board of Education Ovide Lamontagne who went on to lose the election to New Hampshire State Senator Jeanne Shaheen. Zeliff was a member of the ReFormers Caucus of Issue One.

Personal life and death
Zeliff lived in Jackson, New Hampshire and Venice, Florida, and worked as a private advocate. He was married to Sydna Taylor and had three children.

He died at home in Florida on October 18, 2021, at the age of 85.

References

External links

Electronic Frontiers New Hampshire: Bill Zeliff

1936 births
2021 deaths
Connecticut National Guard personnel
DuPont people
People from Carroll County, New Hampshire
People from East Orange, New Jersey
Republican Party members of the United States House of Representatives from New Hampshire
University of Connecticut alumni
Members of Congress who became lobbyists